Bernard Roizman (born April 17, 1929) is an American scientist born in Romania. He is the Joseph Regenstein Distinguished Service Professor of Virology in the Departments of Microbiology and Molecular Genetics and Cell Biology at the University of Chicago.

Early life and education
Roizman was born in Chisinau, Romania in 1929. As he later recalled, his early life was "shaped by World War II"  and the hardships his family endured as war refugees after being displaced in 1941 by the German invasion of the Soviet Union. The family eventually made their way to the United States in 1948, where they settled in Philadelphia. Roizman received a scholarship to attend a Pennsylvanian college and enrolled at Temple University, from which he received his bachelor's and master's degrees. He subsequently attended the Johns Hopkins School of Public Health where he received his Sc.D. in 1956.

Academic career and research
Roizman joined the faculty at Johns Hopkins after graduation, and later spent a year as a visiting scientist at the Institut Pasteur in Paris. When he returned to the United States he joined the faculty at the University of Chicago in 1965. He served as department chair from 1985 to 1988. He was one of several prominent virologists involved in the founding of the American Society for Virology and organized a key meeting in Chicago that led to the society's establishment.

Roizman's research interests focused on the herpes simplex virus, particularly on regulation of viral genes and on the use of site-specific mutagenesis to study viral gene function. In 1999 he was involved in an inventorship dispute with a member of his research group, whose lawsuit was ultimately successful.

Awards and honors
 Elected: Member of the United States National Academy of Sciences, 1979
 Fellow, American Academy of Arts and Sciences, 1991
 Fellow, American Academy of Microbiology, 1992
 Bristol-Myers Squibb Award for Distinguished Achievement in Infectious Disease Research, 1998
 Foreign Member, Chinese Academy of Engineering, 2000
 Institute of Medicine, 2001
 Fellow, American Association for the Advancement of Science, 2004
 Selman A. Waksman Award in Microbiology, 2017

References

External links

Bernard Roizman profile at the University of Chicago

University of Chicago faculty
Johns Hopkins Bloomberg School of Public Health alumni
American virologists
American people of Romanian-Jewish descent
Living people
Members of the United States National Academy of Sciences
Foreign members of the Chinese Academy of Engineering
Temple University alumni
1929 births
Johns Hopkins Bloomberg School of Public Health
Fellows of the American Academy of Microbiology
Members of the National Academy of Medicine